Baron de Ramsey, of Ramsey Abbey in the County of Huntingdon, is a title in the Peerage of the United Kingdom. It was created in 1887 for Edward Fellowes, who had previously represented Huntingdonshire in the House of Commons as a Conservative for 43 years. His eldest son, the second Baron, sat as Member of Parliament for Huntingdonshire and Ramsey and later served as a Lord-in-waiting (government whip in the House of Lords) from 1890 to 1892 in the Conservative administration of Lord Salisbury. His grandson, the third Baron, was Lord Lieutenant of Huntingdonshire from 1947 to 1965 and of Huntingdon and Peterborough between 1965 and 1968.  the title is held by the latter's son, the fourth Baron, who succeeded in 1993.

Ailwyn Fellowes, 1st Baron Ailwyn, was the younger son of the first Baron de Ramsey.

The family seat, is now Abbots Ripton Hall, near Abbots Ripton, Cambridgeshire. Previously the family seat was Ramsey Abbey, near Ramsey, Cambridgeshire.

Barons de Ramsey (1887)
Edward Fellowes, 1st Baron de Ramsey (1809–1887)
William Henry Fellowes, 2nd Baron de Ramsey (1848–1925)
Ailwyn Edward Fellowes, 3rd Baron de Ramsey (1910–1993)
John Ailwyn Fellowes, 4th Baron de Ramsey (b. 1942)

The heir apparent is the present holder's son the Hon. Frederick John Fellowes (b. 1978).

See also
Baron Ailwyn

References
Kidd, Charles & Williamson, David (editors). Debrett's Peerage and Baronetage (1990 edition). New York: St Martin's Press, 1990.

Baronies in the Peerage of the United Kingdom
Noble titles created in 1887
Noble titles created for UK MPs